
Harmon may refer to:

Places

Canada
 Ernest Harmon Air Force Base, also known as Harmon, a former United States military installation
 Harmon Links, a golf course  in Stephenville, Newfoundland

United States
 Harmon, Illinois
 Harmon, Louisiana
 Harmon, Oklahoma
 Harmon, Wisconsin, a ghost town
 Harmon Air Force Base, former United States Air Forces base in Guam
 Harmon County, Oklahoma
 Harmon Industrial Park, an area of Tamuning, Guam
 Croton-Harmon (Metro-North station), in New York

People
 Harmon (name), people named Harmon

Arts, entertainment, and media
 HarmonQuest, an animated series by Dan Harmon
 Harmontown, a weekly comedy show and podcast by Dan Harmon
 Harmon, a brand of trumpet mute
 Harmon, a fictional town in the film Accepted
 Beth Harmon, protagonist of novel, and Netflix miniseries adaptation The Queen's Gambit

Aviation
 Harmon Der Donnerschlag, an American homebuilt aircraft design
 Harmon Engineering Company, an American aircraft design firm
 Harmon Mister America, an American homebuilt aircraft design

Enterprises and organizations
 Harmon Face Values an American chain of discount healthcare and beauty supply stores that shut down in 2023.
Harmon Meadow also known as "The Plaza at Harmon Meadow", a commercial complex in New Jersey
 The Harmon Building, in Las Vegas, Nevada
 William E. Harmon Foundation, a non-profit known for its support and patronage of African-American artists during the first half of the 20th century

See also
Harman (disambiguation)